The Hockey RaboTrophy was an international field hockey tournament held by the Koninklijke Nederlandse Hockey Bond (KNHB).

History
The HockeyRabo Trophy was founded in 2002 by the KNHB. The first edition featured only a men's tournament, while a women's competition was introduced in 2003. In 2003, the competition was formed into a supplementary tournament of the Hockey Champions Trophy.

Throughout the years, the format of competition has changed, with some editions comprising only a sing round-robin format, while others have comprised a classification round to determine final rankings.

There were four men's and five women's tournaments hosted in the competition's 15–year history. The Netherlands men and women were the most successful teams in the RaboTrophy, winning two and three titles, respectively.

Men's tournament

Summaries

Team appearances

Women's tournament

Summaries

Team appearances

All-time statistics

Goalscorers

Men

Women

References

External links
Koninklijke Nederlandse Hockey Bond
International Hockey Federation

 
RaboTrophy
Recurring sporting events established in 2003
Recurring sporting events disestablished in 2018
RaboTrophy